BigSoccer.com is a soccer-related Internet forum in the United States. The site has more than 150,000 registered users, and had over 1.2 million unique visitors during the 2006 FIFA World Cup.  Forty percent of the site's traffic comes from outside the United States, with the site having particular popularity in Canada, Mexico, United Kingdom, Australia and Germany.

Influence in American soccer
BigSoccer, described by Richard Deitsch of SI.com as "arguably the nerve center of American soccer", is read by prominent members of American soccer, including players, officials and coaches, as well as members of the media.

Former Chicago Fire general manager Peter Wilt regularly used the site to communicate with the club's supporters, and D.C. United senior vice president Stephen Zack does the same. Former US national team head coach Bruce Arena, who was introduced to BigSoccer by his successor Bob Bradley, said the site "helps me with some reports from Guatemala. I can find out more about their team over the Internet than just about any other way." And in October 2006, Major League Soccer commissioner Don Garber invited BigSoccer readers to submit questions, and his answers, whose subjects ranged from the league's marketing strategy to expansion, were posted on the site.

History

Founded by Jesse Hertzberg as personal hobby in 1995 with Ethan Beard joining in 1997, the site was  originally located at www.inch.com/~huss and was created in the wake of the 1994 FIFA World Cup in the United States and in anticipation of the launch of Major League Soccer (which eventually was delayed from 1995 to 1996). The site was used to post links to MLS and US Soccer related news, with a particular focus on his local MLS team in New York (soon to be announced as the MetroStars, now known as the New York Red Bulls).

In the beginning, a significant number of BigSoccer posters came from the North American Soccer (NAS) listserv. In the early to mid-90s, the NAS list was one of the best sources of information and one of the few opportunities for community for supporters of the United States men's national soccer team. With the advent of MLS, the NAS list soon sprouted listservs for many of the teams in the new league as well. As the "bulletin board" technology advanced, the listservs soon faded away.

The site evolved in two directions, becoming two distinct sites, MetroFan.com and SoccerBoards.com (which evolved into the current BigSoccer.com). While MetroFan continued to focus on the local MLS squad and eventually evolved into MetroFanatic.com, SoccerBoards invited other MLS fan clubs to join an interactive forum where they could share news, gossip, opinions, etc. about their local MLS side, the league, and US Soccer, as well other soccer teams and leagues around the world.

SoccerBoards continued to be a hobby for its founders until 2000, when, with financial backing from StarMedia Network, the business was renamed BigSoccer and became a full-time endeavor. The company acquired Matchday USA, a soccer magazine and online retailer, later that year. Though the magazine was subsequently shut down, the retail operations have grown substantially and today the BigSoccer Shop, in partnership with 365 and Eurosport, carries over 10,000 products from dozens of countries and hundreds of teams.

In addition to NAS, many smaller online soccer communities migrated to BigSoccer. These include Soccer America Graffiti.

Partnerships

 In 2003, BigSoccer partnered with News Corporation's Fox Sports World to become the network's official online community provider. The relationship was terminated in 2004.
 In August 2006, BigSoccer launched a partnership with Major League Soccer, to become the official supplier of online community tools to the league's and teams' official websites.

References

External links

Association football websites
Sport Internet forums
Soccer mass media in the United States
Internet properties established in 2000